Pat McDonell is the Sergeant-at-Arms and Director General of Protective Services for the Canadian House of Commons. He first served under, and then took over the duties of Kevin Vickers when Vickers was appointed Canadian Ambassador to Ireland in January 2015, on an interim basis. He was confirmed in this role on July 1, 2019. https://pm.gc.ca/en/news/backgrounders/2019/07/04/patrick-mcdonell 

The Sergeant-at-Arms is responsible for the safety and security of the Parliament buildings and occupants, and ensuring and controlling access to the House of Commons. The position includes the ceremonial function of carrying the ceremonial gold mace into the House of Commons before every sitting. He joined the Parliamentary security team as head of Senate Security in late 2010 or early 2011.

McDonell was honored by a standing ovation from Parliament along with Vickers and the rest of the security team after a gunman shot a soldier standing guard at the National War Memorial before storming Parliament Hill and being killed by Vickers in the Hall of Honour on October 22, 2014.

Prior to his role in Parliament, McDonell served in the Royal Canadian Mounted Police (RCMP) for 30 years, rising to the rank of Assistant Commissioner. His last RCMP post was head of RCMP's protective policing unit, which includes the Mounties who patrol Parliament Hill and Embassies in Ottawa and Canada's air marshall service.

References

Living people
Royal Canadian Mounted Police officers
Sergeants-at-Arms of the Canadian House of Commons
Year of birth missing (living people)